Love In Bangalore is a 1966 Indian Kannada-language film, directed and produced by Kalyan Kumar. The film stars Kalyan Kumar, Bharathi, Ramesh and Narasimharaju in the lead roles. The film has musical score by S. P. Kodandapani.

Plot

Cast 
Kalyan Kumar
Bharathi
Ramesh
Narasimharaju

References

External links 
 

1960s Kannada-language films